The Royal Hospital, Wolverhampton was an acute general hospital in the All Saints inner city area of Wolverhampton.

History
The hospital was designed by Edward Banks in the classical style and built between 1846 and 1849 on land acquired from the Henry Vane, 2nd Duke of Cleveland. It was opened as the South Staffordshire Hospital but became the Wolverhampton and Staffordshire General Hospital in the second half of the 19th century. The internal layout rapidly became outdated when the pavilion system, where patients were separated by type of illness, was introduced at new hospitals in 1852. Additions included a new wing for in-patients as well as a new block for out-patients in 1872, a fever ward in 1873, a medical library in 1877, an additional two-storey in-patient wing in 1912 and the vast King Edward VII Memorial Wing in 1923. It was renamed the Royal Hospital, Wolverhampton in December 1928. A further block of in-patient wards was completed in the late 1930s.

The hospital closed in June 1997 with services being transferred to New Cross Hospital; the site was acquired for retail development by Tesco in 2001 but, after that development stalled in January 2015, the site was sold on to the Homes and Communities Agency for residential development in March 2016.

The hospitals name lives on thanks to the nearby West Midlands Metro tram stop, The Royal.

References

Hospitals in the West Midlands (county)
Buildings and structures in Wolverhampton
1849 establishments in England
1997 disestablishments in England
Hospitals disestablished in 1997
Defunct hospitals in England